Swan River National Wildlife Refuge is a  National Wildlife Refuge in Lake County of  northwestern Montana. It is a unit of the National Bison Range Complex.

Description
The refuge was primarily set aside to protect prime habitat for various species of birds and particularly waterfowl. The refuge consists of a wide floodplain of the Swan River, though the river has relocated to the western sections of the refuge due to silt buildup. 
 
171 bird species have been observed at the refuge, including teals, great blue heron and a pair of nesting bald eagles, the last of which may be due to the abundance of fish in the Swan River. Numerous mammals such as the white-tailed deer, elk, moose, black bear, coyote, bobcat and beaver can all be found here. The grizzly bear may occasionally wander in from surrounding mountains.

See also

References

External links
 Swan River National Wildlife Refuge

National Bison Range Complex
National Wildlife Refuges in Montana
Protected areas of Lake County, Montana
Wetlands of Montana
Landforms of Lake County, Montana